Superintending Surveyor (SS) is a Senior Time Scale Group 'A' engineering post in Survey of India Service, an Organized Engineering Service in Survey of India National Survey Organization under Department of Science and Technology (India). Appointment to this post is made by promotion from Deputy Superintending Surveyor (DSS) which is the entry-level post in the said service & from Officer Surveyor (OS). The total number of vacancies of SS is distributed between DSS of army stream, civil stream & Officer Surveyor.

See also
 Surveyor General of India

External links 
 Official website of the Survey of India

Indian surveyors
Indian government officials